Head In a Box is the first EP by The Vincent Black Shadow, released on December 8, 2008, by Beef Records.

Track listing

Personnel
The Vincent Black Shadow
 Cassandra Ford – lead vocals
 Robbie Kirkham – guitars
 Anthony Kirkham – drums, percussion
 Chris Kirkham – bass guitar

References

The Vincent Black Shadow albums
2008 EPs